James Robertson (May 18, 1938 – September 7, 2019) was a United States district judge of the United States District Court for the District of Columbia from 1994 until his retirement in June 2010. Robertson also served on the Foreign Intelligence Surveillance Court from 2002 until December 2005, when he resigned from that court in protest against warrantless wiretapping.

Early life, education, and Navy service
Robertson was born in Cleveland, Ohio, on May 18, 1938; his father was a banker, his mother a social worker. Robertson had a twin sister. He was raised in Oberlin, Ohio, and Dayton, Ohio. He attended his freshman year of high school in the public schools and then transferred to Western Reserve Academy in Hudson, Ohio. He received a B.A. cum laude from Princeton University in 1959, on a Navy ROTC scholarship. Robertson was a member of the American Whig–Cliosophic Society at Princeton.

Robertson served in the United States Navy from 1959 to 1964, achieving the rank of lieutenant. He served on a radar picket destroyer with a home port in Jacksonville, Florida, first in the position of deck officer, then as anti-submarine warfare officer, and then as gunnery officer. Robertson spent his last two years in the Navy on desk duty at the Office of Naval Intelligence at The Pentagon and simultaneously attended the George Washington University Law School as a night student.  After leaving the Navy, he finished his third year as a day student, and was editor-in-chief of The George Washington Law Review. He received his LL.B in 1965.

Legal career
With the exception of a three-year gap from 1969 to 1972, Robertson was in private practice in Washington, D.C. from 1965 to 1994 at the law firm of Wilmer, Cutler & Pickering. While at Wilmer, Cutler & Pickering, Robertson worked under Louis F. Oberdorfer and later represented the Automobile Manufacturers Association in connection with the development of Federal Motor Vehicle Safety Standards. From 1969 to 1972, when Robertson served with the Lawyers' Committee for Civil Rights Under Law, as chief counsel at the organization's offices in Jackson, Mississippi (1969–1970) and as national director in Washington, D.C. (1970–1972). 

He became a partner at Wilmer, Cutler & Pickering in 1973. While in private practice, he served as president of the District of Columbia Bar (1991–1992), and president of the Southern Africa Legal Services and Legal Education Project (1989–1994).

Federal judicial service

Appointment and confirmation
On September 14, 1994, Robertson was nominated by President Bill Clinton to a seat on the United States District Court for the District of Columbia vacated by George Hughes Revercomb. The American Bar Association's Standing Committee on the Federal Judiciary, which rates judicial nominees, unanimously rated Robertson as "well qualified" (the committee's highest rating). Robertson was confirmed by the United States Senate on October 7, 1994, by voice vote. He received his commission four days later.

Resignation from FISA Court
Chief Justice William Rehnquist appointed Robertson to the Foreign Intelligence Surveillance Court (FISA Court) on May 19, 2002. On December 20, 2005, Robertson resigned from the FISA court, sending a letter to Chief Justice John G. Roberts announcing his resignation. His resignation was in protest against the NSA warrantless surveillance that had occurred outside the FISA statute, a program revealed by the New York Times one week before Robertson's resignation. In 2013, following his retirement from the judiciary, Robertson testified before the Privacy and Civil Liberties Oversight Board (PCLOB) and said that he had resigned in protest of the George W. Bush administration's warrantless wiretaps, which bypassed the FISA Court. Robertson also criticized the 2008 amendments to the Foreign Intelligence Surveillance Act, in which Congress allowed the FISA Court to approve collection of data in bulk, in addition to warrants targeted at individuals. In Robertson's view, this change "turned the FISA court into something like an administrative agency, which makes and approves rules for others to follow," which he viewed as not being a proper role for the judiciary.

Robertson was an early and prominent advocate of the need for an institutional adversary process within the FISA Court, to allow FISA judges to hear arguments from counsel other than the government's counsel. In an oral history, Robertson said:

A compromise provision in the 2015 USA Freedom Act adopted a form of adversary process within the FISA Court, allowing the court's judges to call upon a panel of attorneys as amicus curiae to offer adversary views; Robertson viewed this reform as a sufficient process to satisfy adversaries.

Notable rulings
Notable rulings by Robertson include: 

 Hamdan v. Rumsfeld: Yemeni prisoner Salim Ahmed Hamdan, a chauffeur for Osama bin Laden, was imprisoned by the U.S. military at Guantanamo Bay detainment camp without charge. A military tribunal declared Hamdan an enemy combatant. Hamdan sought a writ of habeas corpus. Robertson ruled in favor of Hamdan's favor, finding that the United States could not hold a military commission unless it was first shown that the detainee was not a prisoner of war. The U.S. Supreme Court upheld Robertson's ruling in 2006.

 United States v. Hubbell: In 1998, Robertson dismissed the indictment of Webster L. Hubbell on tax evasion charges. Robertson held that independent counsel Kenneth W. Starr exceeded his authority by charging Hubbell, and criticized Starr for going on a "quintessential fishing expedition."

 American Council of the Blind v. Snow: In 2006, Robertson ruled in favor of the American Council of the Blind, holding that the U.S. Department of the Treasury's "failure to design and issue paper currency that is readily distinguishable to blind and visually impaired individuals violates section 504 of the Rehabilitation Act." Robertson noted that "Of the more than 180 countries that issue paper currency, only the United States prints bills that are identical in size and color in all their denominations." The decision was affirmed by the D.C. Circuit on appeal.

 Schroer v. Billington: In a suit brought by a transgender employee against the Library of Congress, Robertson ruled in 2006 that employment discrimination against transgender persons may violate Title VII's prohibition on discrimination "because of ... sex." In 2008, following a trial, Robertson ruled that the employee's civil rights were violated.

Retirement and death
After serving for 14 years, Robertson assumed senior status on the District Court on December 31, 2008; he fully retired on June 1, 2010. After retiring from the bench, Robertson became a mediator and arbitrator with JAMS, deciding complex commercial cases. He also wrote two op-eds published in the Washington Post.

Robertson died on September 7, 2019 at age 81, in Washington, D.C., due to heart disease.

Personal life
Robertson married Berit Persson in 1959; they had three children and six grandchildren.

Robertson lived in North Bethesda, Maryland and later Georgetown.

References

External links

1938 births
2019 deaths
20th-century American judges
George Washington University Law School alumni
Judges of the United States District Court for the District of Columbia
Judges of the United States Foreign Intelligence Surveillance Court
Judges presiding over Guantanamo habeas petitions
Lawyers from Cleveland
Military personnel from Cleveland
Princeton University alumni
United States district court judges appointed by Bill Clinton
Western Reserve Academy alumni
Wilmer Cutler Pickering Hale and Dorr people
21st-century American judges